The second electoral unit of the Federation of Bosnia and Herzegovina is a parliamentary constituency used to elect members to the House of Representatives of the Federation of Bosnia and Herzegovina since 2000.  It consists of Posavina Canton, the Brčko District, and the Tuzla Canton Municipalities of Gradačac, Doboj East and Gračanica.

Demographics

Representatives

References

Constituencies of Bosnia and Herzegovina